This is a list of members of the Victorian Legislative Assembly, from the elections of 11 May 1877. Victoria was a British self-governing colony in Australia at the time.

There was an electoral redistribution which came into effect in 1877, fourteen districts were created (Barwon, Benambra, Boroondara, Carlton, Delatite, Fitzroy, Footscray, Geelong, Grant, Kara Kara, Kilmore and Anglesey, Maryborough and Talbot, Moira, Stawell) and eight abolished (Kilmore, The Murray, Murray Boroughs, South Grant, Crowlands, Geelong East, Geelong West, Maryborough).

 
Note the "Term in Office" refers to that member's term(s) in the Assembly, not necessarily for that electorate.

Gavan Duffy was Speaker, John James was Chairman of Committees.

 Blackham resigned in July 1877, replaced by Angus Mackay the same  month.
 Dwyer left Parliament around November 1879, replaced by Joseph Jones who was sworn-in in December 1879.
 Farrell resigned around May 1878; replaced by Charles Henry Pearson, sworn-in July 1878.
 King died 13 February 1879; replaced by William Clark, sworn-in July 1879.
 Levien was unseated in December 1877 replaced by John Ince the same month.
 Macartney died 2 June 1878; replaced by Francis Mason, sworn-in July 1878.
 McCulloch resigned around May 1878; replaced by James Francis, sworn-in July 1878.
 Macgregor resigned around June 1879; replaced by Cuthbert Robert Blackett, sworn-in July 1879.
 McMahon resigned in February 1878, replaced by Bryan O'Loghlen the same month.
 Macpherson resigned July 1878; replaced by John Serjeant, sworn-in August 1878.
 G. P. Smith died 6 December 1877, replaced by Robert Murray Smith who was elected on 24 December 1877, sworn-in in February 1878.
 J. Smith died 30 January 1879, replaced by Alfred Deakin who was sworn-in in July 1879.

References

Members of the Parliament of Victoria by term
19th-century Australian politicians